Vlkančice is a municipality and village in Prague-East District in the Central Bohemian Region of the Czech Republic. It has about 200 inhabitants.

Administrative parts
The village of Pyskočely is an administrative part of Vlkančice.

History
The first written mention of Vlkančice is from 1436.

References

Villages in Prague-East District